Chipperfield is a village and civil parish in England.

Chipperfield may also refer to:
Chipperfield, Saskatchewan a hamlet in Saskatchewan, Canada

People with the surname
Arthur Chipperfield, Australian cricketer
David Alan Chipperfield, British architect
Jimmy Chipperfield, English footballer
Mary Chipperfield, circus entertainer
Ron Chipperfield, Canadian former professional ice hockey player
Scott Chipperfield, Australian international football (soccer) player
Sheila Chipperfield, bassist in Elastica

See also
Chipperfield's Circus, an English family show